Reed Alexander (born December 23, 1994) is an American actor, journalist, and author. He is currently a financial news reporter for Insider, formerly “Business Insider,” covering Wall Street and investment banking. Among his most recognizable credentials from his time as an actor is his role as Nevel Papperman in Nickelodeon's iCarly. He reprised the role of Nevel on an episode of Sam & Cat as well as the Paramount+ revival of iCarly.

Career 
Alexander first received recognition for his food blog that began in 2009 which turned into a second career as a spokesman for healthy eating habits. He appeared in Will & Grace for which he was nominated for a Young Artist Award for Best Performance in a Television Series (Comedy) – Guest Starring Actor. He was also in 2009's direct-to-video telefilm Ace Ventura Jr.: Pet Detective.

Alexander attended the First inauguration of Barack Obama after "helping out [a] local grass roots campaigns for one of the political parties in the Presidential Election of 2008." Alexander has been a spokesperson for the American Heart Association and Clinton Foundation's  anti-obesity program called Alliance for a Healthier Generation, has been involved in promoting Michelle Obama's Let's Move! initiative, and has been credited with being able to get healthy eating messages to young audiences. He has published a website on healthy eating geared toward young people and a book, KewlBites: 100 Nutritious, Delicious, and Family-Friendly Dishes (2013).

Alexander obtained his undergraduate degree in media studies and broadcast journalism from New York University. , he had graduated with his master's of science in journalism at Columbia University. He is currently a financial news reporter at Insider Inc. Starting in 2022, Alexander started a new position as a Lecturer for Journalism Studies at the University of Miami.

Filmography

References

External links 

1994 births
American male child actors
American male television actors
Male actors from Florida
Living people
People from Boca Raton, Florida
21st-century American male actors
American male journalists